Dragan Đilas (born 22 February 1967) is a Serbian businessman and politician who served as the mayor of Belgrade from 2008 to 2013.

From 25 November 2012 until 31 May 2014, he served as the President of the Democratic Party (DS), the nation's main opposition party.

As a member of the Democratic Party, Đilas served as the mayor of the Serbian capital city between 2008 and 2013. He served as the Minister without Portfolio in charge of the National Investment Plan in the 2007–2008 Cabinet of Serbia and prior to that as the director of the People's Office of the President between 2004 and 2007.

On 18 April 2011, Đilas became the President of Basketball Federation of Serbia (KSS). He resigned in October 2016.

Prior to leaving the KSS, Đilas left the Democratic Party in April 2016. He continued his political career after leaving, running in the 2018 Belgrade City Assembly election before afterwards announcing a new political opposition alliance, the Alliance for Serbia. In 2019, he was elected president of the newly-formed Party of Freedom and Justice (SSP).

Early life and career
Đilas was born in 1967 in Belgrade. His father comes from Očigrije, near Bihać, while his mother is from Banatski Brestovac but has heritage from Lika.

Đilas graduated from the University of Belgrade Faculty of Mechanical Engineering in the aerospace engineering program.

He worked as journalist at Radio Index. On 15 May 1989, part of Radio Index merged with Ritam Srca radio programme thus forming Radio B92, meaning that Đilas was one of the new station's founders. He soon became a news editor at the station.

Simultaneously, Đilas was active in opposing the rule of Slobodan Milošević, leading the student protests in 1991 and 1992. On 19 March 1991, only ten days following the violent March 9th Protest that claimed two lives and the ensuing student clashes with the police, Milošević (at that time the President of Serbia) came to the University of Belgrade in order to face the students where student leader Đilas got a chance to address him in an uncomfortable encounter recorded by the TV cameras. Later, Đilas was part of an official student delegation that Milošević received. As a student leader/activist, in June 1992, Đilas appeared on RTS interview programme Razgovor s povodom thus getting 50 minutes of air time on state television, which he used to further criticize Milošević's policies. All throughout this period Đilas continuously received offers from two largest opposition parties at that time, the Serbian Renewal Movement (SPO) and the Democratic Party (DS) to join their ranks, but he refused.

In the coming years, he continued to actively participate in various anti-Milošević rallies between 1996 and 2000, although by now his activism took a back seat to his budding business career in the mass media market.

Business career
Since the mid-1990s, Đilas is very active in the Serbian media market. After completion of the journalistic career has entered into marketing business as media director at the agency "Saatchi & Saatchi". He then went to Prague, and along with Mlađan Đorđević and few other friends opened company in 1995. He began his first business in Belgrade 1998.

He has a minority stake in a limited-liability company called Multikom Group whose ownership is divided between Đilas (25%), Dragoslav Ilić (42%), Milica Delević (25%) and Nebojša Garić (8%).

The company is also active in Bosnia-Herzegovina, North Macedonia, and Montenegro.

Since 2001, Đilas co-owns (through Multikom Group) a closed joint stock company called Direct Media, a media company that sells advertising space in various Serbian electronic media outlets. The company also offers ad rights in large sporting events such as the World Cup, Olympics, and World Basketball Championships.

Political career
Even though he was politically active in various forms since his early youth, Đilas officially entered politics in 2004 when he joined the Democratic Party (DS).

People's Office
On October 1, 2004, Đilas became the director of the People's Office, instituted by the newly elected President of Serbia Boris Tadić. The creation of People's Office was one of Tadić's election promises at the June 2004 presidential elections. Đilas stayed in the position until May 2007 when the new Government of Serbia was finally formed by the DS and the DSS-NS coalition almost 5 months after January 2007 parliamentary election. He became the Minister without Portfolio in charge of the National Investment Plan (NIP).

Minister without Portfolio in charge of NIP
His tenure, however, was short-lived since the government fell in February 2008 following the declaration of independence of Kosovo.

Đilas' time in office was marked by frequent vicious clashes with the government colleague Minister for Capital Investment Velimir Ilić. The two already had history of public feuding when they became part of the same cabinet in May 2007. It didn't take long for their feud to reignite and in October 2007 things boiled over when Ilić placed an angry, obscenity-laced phone call to Đilas' office, the transcript of which ended up in Serbian media.

Mayor of Belgrade
On 19 August 2008, Đilas was sworn in as the new Mayor of Belgrade.

During the 2008 Belgrade mayoral election campaign, Đilas was often denounced as a "tycoon" by the Liberal Democratic Party due to his amassed personal wealth. There was even a wall-spraying campaign with the phrase "Đilas Tajkun" written on various buildings around Belgrade. However, the party denied any link with the sprayed writings.

He was dismissed as mayor on 18 November 2013 and Siniša Mali was appointed as president of the Temporary Council of Belgrade.

President of the Democratic Party 
In November 2012, he was elected president of the Democratic Party, replacing Boris Tadić. After the poor election results in the 2014 parliamentary elections, the DS Election Assembly was held in May, where he lost the party presidency to Bojan Pajtić. In October 2014, he resigned as a member of the National Assembly and withdrew from public life.

He left the party in June 2016, but did not want to comment on the reasons for such a decision.

Alliance for Serbia 
After Belgrade City Council elections in 2018 when his list won 18.93% of the popular vote, Đilas announced a formation of a new opposition political alliance – as a counterweight to ruling SNS. His ambition was to gather all opposition political parties and organizations, regardless of their political orientation. He partially succeeded in this, and SzS was officially formed in September 2018, gathering both center left parties like DS and center right parties like NS. Since Đilas welcomed Dveri (a right wing political party) into the alliance, some liberal and left leaning organizations (notably Saša Janković's PSG) refused to take part in the alliance, though they stated they are willing to cooperate on various subjects, especially on the matter of election organization.

Party of Freedom and Justice 
The Party of Freedom and Justice (SSP) was founded in the Belgrade municipality of Stari Grad on 19 April 2019. Đilas was elected as party president, Borko Stefanović as deputy leader and vice-president, and Marinika Tepić and Dejan Bulatović as vice-presidents. The party was able to forgo the usual registration process for political parties in Serbia when Bulatović permitted his Zelena Ekološka Partija – Zeleni to be re-constituted; legally, the SSP is a successor to Bulatović's party.

In 2020, SSP boycotted the parliamentary elections together with a considerable number of other opposition parties.

Political positions and views

European Union and NATO 
Đilas is in favor of Serbia's accession to the European Union, claiming that citizens of Serbia are "part of the European family of nations", and that the accession to the EU should be Serbia's strategic goal.

In April 2014, he said that the ideas that Serbia could seek compensation from NATO countries for the bombing in 1999 were "unfounded", although, as he said, "enormous" damage was inflicted on Serbia at the time. When asked whether Serbia's accession to NATO would accelerate its accession to the EU, Đilas stated that Serbia was "destroyed in the NATO bombing", that "thousands of people were killed" and that it is why it is "pointless" to talk about this topic, adding that Serbia should cooperate with NATO, "which we have been doing for a long time for the security of all who live in this part of Europe," but that Serbia's membership in NATO "is really not a topic."

Kosovo question 

Đilas stated that when it comes to the issue of the disputed territory of Kosovo, the solution is not "partition, but reconciliation", and that Kosovo belongs to both Serbs and Albanians. In September 2019, Đilas told the media that his party's plan for the reconciliation process of Serbs and Albanians envisions that people who committed war crimes or incited war crimes cannot participate in the reconciliation process, while in October 2019 he said "I would never sign an agreement recognizing Kosovo's independence, which is against our laws, international law and contrary to concepts such as morality and the part I still believe in."

Economy 
In one newspaper article, Đilas wrote that he stands for state capitalism and that only state investment, primary in agriculture and energetics, can start up Serbian economy. Instead of privatizing PKB, he proposes a system of state-owned agricultural enterprises which will encourage development of agriculture and food industry.

Personal life and other endeavours
Đilas is the founder and vice president of Naša Srbija humanitarian organisation for Serbian children who were left without one or both parents in the wars in the former Yugoslavia.

He divorced in 2007. He was married to Milica Delević from 1994, who is also politically active. From fall 2003 until mid-August 2004 she headed the Office for Cooperation with the European Union under the Council of Ministers. Then from 2007 until 2008, she was the deputy to Serbian Foreign Minister Vuk Jeremić. From November 2008, she is heading the Office for European Integration in the Serbian Government. They have two daughters together, Sofija and Jovana.

In September 2009, 42-year-old Đilas married the 28-year-old doctor Iva Pelević in a low-key civic ceremony. A year later they had a church wedding. They have a daughter named Ana and a son named Vuk. In 2013 they divorced.

See also
Mayor of Belgrade

References

External links

Biography of the Mayor of Belgrade
Biography of Dragan Đilas

1967 births
Living people
Aerospace engineers
Democratic Party (Serbia) politicians
Party of Freedom and Justice politicians
Mayors of Belgrade
Businesspeople from Belgrade
Serbian democracy activists
Serbian basketball executives and administrators
University of Belgrade Faculty of Mechanical Engineering alumni
Government ministers of Serbia
Members of the National Assembly (Serbia)
Serbian people of Bosnia and Herzegovina descent
Serbian people of Croatian descent